Anthony Matengu (born 28 July 1977) is a Botswana footballer who plays as a goalkeeper for Botswana Meat Commission FC. He won his only cap for the Botswana national football team in 2001.

External links
 

Association football goalkeepers
Botswana footballers
Botswana Police XI SC players
Botswana international footballers
1977 births
Living people
Gilport Lions F.C. players